Edmund Arko-Mensah (born 9 September 2001) is a Ghanaian footballer who plays as a left-back for Veikkausliiga side FC Honka.

Career statistics

Club

Notes

References

2001 births
Living people
Ghanaian footballers
Ghanaian expatriate footballers
Ghana youth international footballers
Association football defenders
Legon Cities FC players
Berekum Chelsea F.C. players
FC Honka players
Ghana Premier League players
Veikkausliiga players
Expatriate footballers in Finland
Ghanaian expatriate sportspeople in Finland